Hudson River Blues is a 1997 independent film.

"The film tells the story of a two-career couple and how they deal with the wife's urge to become a high-powered lawyer and the husband's desire to change jobs and become an environmentalist caring for the Hudson River."  The movie stars Tovah Feldshuh.

Plot

Cast

 Tovah Feldshuh as Charlotte
 Mason Adams as Grandpa
 Patti Allison as Mrs. Sweet
 Marylouise Burke as Drena
 Miles Chapin as Ben
 Polly Draper as Leslie
 Le Clanche du Rand as Polly
 Gregg Edelman as Dudley
 Andre Gregory as Will
 Scott Hakim as Bartender
 Ann Harada as Robin
 Edward Hibbert as Yago
 William Hill as Jerry
 Marceline Hugot as Helen
 Rya Kihlstedt as Laura

References

External links
 

American independent films
1997 films
1990s English-language films
1990s American films